Eaglesham/Codesa South Aerodrome  is located  southwest of Eaglesham, Alberta, Canada.

See also
 Eaglesham/Bice Farm Aerodrome
 Eaglesham South Aerodrome

References

Registered aerodromes in Alberta
Birch Hills County